Milutin Ivanović (born 30 October 1990, Niš) (Serbian Cyrillic: Милутин Ивановић) is a Serbian footballer, who plays for FK Car Konstantin.

Career

Club
Ivanović left FC Shirak on 9 June 2017 by mutual consent.

Statistics

References

External links

Living people
1990 births
Sportspeople from Niš
Serbian footballers
Serbian expatriate footballers
Serbian SuperLiga players
Serbian First League players
FK Radnički Niš players
Yverdon-Sport FC players
FC Shirak players
FK Jagodina players
Expatriate footballers in Switzerland
Expatriate footballers in Armenia
Association football forwards